Jozef Čertík (born 29 April 1985 in Bojnice) is a Slovak football midfielder who currently plays for FC Baník Horná Nitra.

External links
Eurofotbal profile

References

1985 births
Living people
Slovak footballers
Association football midfielders
FC Baník Prievidza players
1. FC Tatran Prešov players
FC DAC 1904 Dunajská Streda players
FK Bodva Moldava nad Bodvou players
MFK Vítkovice players
FK Čáslav players
MŠK Rimavská Sobota players
Sandecja Nowy Sącz players
MFK Lokomotíva Zvolen players
Slovak Super Liga players
Expatriate footballers in the Czech Republic
Expatriate footballers in Poland
Sportspeople from Bojnice